Roberto Oliveira may refer to:

 Roberto Oliveira (footballer, born 1953), Brazilian football manager and former defender
 Roberto de Oliveira (soccer) (born 1955), American soccer forward
 Roberto Oliveira (footballer, born 1980), Brazilian football midfielder